The Ngarrkic (Ngarga) or Yapa languages are a small language family of Central Australia, consisting of the two closely related languages Warlmanpa and the more populous Warlpiri.

The family was named after the common word for initiated man in the member languages, ngarrka. Ngarga is an older spelling. In about 2000 an alternate name was suggested, yapa, based on the word for aboriginal man in the two languages.

In 2004 it was demonstrated that Ngarrkic is related to the neighboring Ngumpin languages.

Footnotes

References
McConvell and Laughren (2004) "The Ngumpin–Yapa subgroup". In Claire Bowern & Harold Koch, Australian Languages: Classification and the Comparative Method. Amsterdam/Philadelphia: John Benjamins Publishing Company.
Dixon, R. M. W. (2002). Australian Languages: Their Nature and Development. Cambridge: Cambridge University Press.

 
Indigenous Australian languages in the Northern Territory